As a result of the general community quarantine in Luzon and downgraded of community quarantine in Metro Manila, the hosts returned to the studio after the enhanced community quarantine in Luzon and the temporary shutdown of ABS-CBN. However, no audience is allowed in the studio to protect artists and staff from the coronavirus. The score of the performance by judge (or hurados) composed of a Head Judge (called as Punong Hurado) and two regular judges and the following criteria for the performance are: Voice quality (50%) and Overall performance (50%).

Judges 
Only Karylle, Randy Santiago, K Brosas, Yeng Constantino, Karla Estrada, Nyoy Volante, Mitoy Yonting, Jed Madela, Kyla, Jaya, Erik Santos & Louie Ocampo served as judges throughout the entire community quarantine period. As a result, the judges were reduced from 5 to 3 judges.

Also, Angeline Quinto served as a guest judge from January 19–23, 2021.

Daily Rounds 

In Round 1, the two contenders from Metro Manila and Luzon (from their other barangay) perform a song in front of stage without a live audience. The contender with the highest and lowest combined scores and advanced to the next round, and if the two contenders with the same highest combined scores and advanced again to the next round.
In Round 2, the contender will pick of songs and then perform again.

The winning daily contender receives ₱15,000 and advanced to Weekly Finals, while the other contender receive a consolation prize of ₱5,000. A daily contender may be "gonged" during this stage and be eliminated from the competition.

Results Details

Italicized names denotes a contender is a resbaker

Week-long Finals

Summary of Daily Winners 

Results Details

Weekly Finals 
The six to seven daily contenders will forward to the Weekly Finals and determine the one or two contenders moving on to the Quarter Finals. The following criteria for the performance are: voice quality (50%) and overall performance (50%).

In Round 1, the weekly finalists will choose the songs and test on their singing by the mentor judge at home, and perform in front of stage. The two weekly finalists with the highest combined scores and advanced in Round 2, and the other finalists are not advanced in Round 2.
In Round 2, the two weekly finalists will pick of songs and then perform again.

The winning weekly finalists receives ₱25,000 and advanced the Quarter Finals and received the medical kits, negosyo package, mobile devices, and other packages and devices, while the other finalists receive a consolation prize of ₱5,000 for those are not advanced in second round, and ₱10,000 for the eliminated in second round. A daily Weekly Finalists may be "gonged" during this stage and be eliminated from the competition.

Dexter Nicolau from San Francisco, Mabalacat, Pampanga (Luzon) withdrew to participate from the competition due to medical reasons.

Results Details

Month-long Quarter Finals 
The 20 Quarter Finalists, divided into five finalists will compete and perform a song based on a theme for each week. The quarter finalists are scored of the following criteria: voice quality (50%) and overall performance (50%). The two or three Quarter Finalists with the highest combined scores at the end of the six days (for 4 weeks) move on to the semifinals and receives ₱50,000, while other finalists for the consolation prize of ₱10,000. If the Quarter Finalists makes a highest combined scores, a home viewer is chosen to instant ₱5,000. The Quarter Finals week aired on November 23—December 19, 2020. A quarter finalist may be "gonged" during this stage and be eliminated from the competition.

Erwin Diaz from Bawi, Padre Garcia, Batangas (Luzon) participated in the competition during Week 3, Day 1 but then withdrew in Week 3, Day 2 due to voice problem.

Daily Rounds 
Results Details

Final Results 
Results Details

Semifinals 
The winning Quarter Finalists will forward to the Semifinals and determine the three semifinalists moving on to the grand finals. The three grand finalists will receive a medal and an additional ₱100,000 cash. If the semifinalists makes a highest combined scores, a home viewer is chosen to instant ₱5,000. The Semifinals week originally took place on December 21–26, 2020 due to the 1-week Christmas break, later originally reschedule on December 28, 2020, to January 2, 2021, but was moved due to Quarter 1 Semifinals, and later reschedule again on January 4–9, 2021. A semi-finalist may be "gonged" during this stage and be eliminated from the competition.

Results Details

Ayegee Paredes (Mindanao), JM Yosures (Metro Manila) and Mara Tumale (Luzon) were declared as the 4th, 5th and 6th grand finalists.

Resbakbakan 

Due to the popularity of the Quarter Finals and Semifinals Rounds, the show added another phase, dubbed as Resbakbakan. Losing quarter-finalists (Week 1), weekly finalists selected by the hurados (Week 2), and semifinalists (Week 3) who are not gonged may still advance to the week-long Grand Finals through the Resbakbakan Week as wildcards.

The Resbakbakan started immediately after the final day of New Normal Semifinals Round, aired from January 11 to 16, 2021 (Week 1), from January 18 to 23, 2021 (Week 2), and from January 25 to 30, 2021 (Week 3).

It uses a similar format as the Final Resbak in third season, where it follows a last man standing format.

It follows the mechanics below:

 On its first day, the resbaker on the Seat of Power was determined through draw lots.
 The resbaker who is in the Seat of Power picks two resbakers. The three resbakers will be pitted against each other for a chance to claim the Seat of Power. The winner is selected by the majority of the judges. The resbaker with the highest score claims the Seat of Power while the resbaker with the lowest score is eliminated in the competition.
 The resbaker who is in the Seat of Power has the choice to keep their seat and continue the battle, or dethrone and rest. The resbaker choosing to keep the seat will chose one resbaker. Else, the resbaker will choose two resbakers for a sing-off battle with the top 2 resbaker in the previous day. The resbaker with the highest score claims the Seat of Power.
 Resbaker keeping the seat of power for three consecutive days receives an additional 15,000.
 The remaining contender in the Seat of Power at the end of the round will move forward to the week long Grand-Finals dubbed as "Ang Huling Tapatan" while the other contenders are eliminated.

Marlyn Salas (Luzon), Mark Anthony Castro (Luzon), and Arlene Cagas (Metro Manila) chose not to participate in this round due to their other priorities.

Resbakbakan Week 1 (Quarter Finalists)

Summary of Quarter Finalist Resbakers 
Color Key:

Results Details:

Color Key:

Resbakbakan 1 Details 
Color Key:

Donna Gift Ricafrente (Metro Manila) was declared as the 7th grand finalist.

=== Resbakbakan Week 2 (Hurados''' Pick) ===
The concept of Hurados Pick is similar to the Instant Resbak of third season where each Hurado can pick a contender who failed to qualify in the previous rounds.

 Summary of Hurados' Pick Resbakers Color Key:Results Details:Color Key: Resbakbakan 2 Details Color Key:Makki Lucino (Luzon) was declared as the 8th grand finalist.

 Resbakbakan Week 3 (Semifinalists) 
The concept of the third week of Resbakbakan is similar to the Ultimate Resbak of third season where losing semifinalists return as wildcards.

 Summary of Semifinalist Resbakers Color Key:Results Details:Color Key: Resbakbakan 3 Details Color Key:Rachell Laylo (Luzon) was declared as the 9th grand finalist.

 Elimination table Results Details'''

References 

Notes

Sources

External links
 Tawag ng Tanghalan

Tawag ng Tanghalan seasons
2020 Philippine television seasons